The 2013 Marbella Cup is the third edition of the tournament in Marbella Cup tournament is held in the Spanish resort of Costa del Sol.

Participants
 Atlético Paranaense
 Dinamo București
 Dynamo Kyiv
 Lech Poznań
 Ludogorets Razgrad
 Oțelul Galați
 Rapid București
 Torpedo Kutaisi

Match

Winner's
  (1)  Atlético Paranaense
 (2)  Dinamo București
 (3)  Dynamo Kyiv

External links
 Official Site
 Scorespro
  Ziarulring
  Sportline
 Marbella Cup 2013(present teams) (PL)
 History Marbella Cup (PL)

2013
2013 in Brazilian football
2012–13 in Romanian football
2012–13 in Ukrainian football
2012–13 in Polish football
2012–13 in Bulgarian football
2012–13 in Georgian football